The Apothecaries' Hall of Ireland is one of only two extant successors of a medieval Dublin guild. Medieval apothecaries in Dublin were first organized as members of 1446 Guild of Barbers, Apothecaries and Periwigmakers, with St Mary Magdelene as the patron saint. In 1747, Apothecaries formed their own guild, with St Luke as the patron. In 1791, the Company of Apothecaries’ Hall was formed for the purpose of building a Hall and regulating practitioners. Although the Company ceased licensing doctors in 1971, it continues to exist as a charitable organisation. The Company of Apothecaries’ Hall is now hosted by and shares premises with the Royal College of Physicians of Ireland on Kildare Street, Dublin.

History

Guild of St Mary Magdelene
Medieval apothecaries in Dublin were members of Guild of Barbers, Surgeons, Apothecaries and Periwigmakers. The patron of the guild was St Mary Magdelene. The Barbers’ Guild was founded in 1446 by a charter of Henry VI (25 Henry VI) (the earliest royal medical foundation in Britain or Ireland, before the Edinburgh equivalent in 1505, and that of London in 1462), and it was united with Surgeons in 1576 by a charter of Elizabeth I (19 Eliz. I) (Barbers and Surgeons were united in London in 1540, by Act of Parliament).

The Guild of St Mary Magdelene was 4th in precedence, with four members on Common Council of the City of Dublin.

Guild of St Luke
The Apothecaries separated from the Barber-Surgeons in 1747, by a royal charter of George II of 1745 (20 Geo. II). The patron of the new Apothecaries’ Guild was St Luke the Evangelist, and the Guild of St Luke was 25th in precedence, with two members on the Common Council. (The Barbers’ representation on Common Council dropped from four to two members when the Apothecaries seceded).

The guild colours (established in 1767) were purple and orange. (These may have been a variation of the gold/blue livery colours of the London Worshipful Society of Apothecaries – which had seceded from the London Grocers’ Company in 1617 – and the crest of which – a rhinoceros – appears to also have been adopted by the Dublin guild.)

Company of Apothecaries’ Hall
In 1791, by Act of Parliament (31 Geo. III, c.34), the Company of Apothecaries’ Hall was established following a petition from The Master, Wardens and Commonality of the Corporation of Apothecaries (the Guild) and other apothecaries of the City of Dublin (as "The Governor and Company of the Apothecaries' Hall of the City of Dublin"). The purpose of the new Company, its Governor, Directors and subscribers was primarily to raise a fund to erect a Hall, but also to prevent "frauds and abuses" and so that from thereon there might be a single "...company or fraternity of judicious apothecaries..." in Dublin.

As noted in the Act, the first Governor was Henry Hunt (1707-1796), who had previously been appointed the first State Apothecary (1784).  He was born at Curragh Chase according to Burke's, the son of John "of Glangoole" Hunt and Margaret Bowles, his second wife.

The company, although the structure and membership would have been practically the same, was independent of the Guild of St Luke. The guild did not survive the reform of Dublin Corporation in the 1830s.

Amongst the principal duties of the company from its foundation was to examine candidates and qualify them to trade as an apothecary. A Licence from Apothecaries' Hall (LAH) became a registrable qualification when the General Medical Council was established as the regulator of medical practitioners in 1858, confirming that holders of the qualification practiced medicine. The company continued to license doctors until 1971 when the General Medical Council and the Medical Registration Council of Ireland ceased to recognise qualifications from Apothecaries' Hall. Since an Act of Parliament established the hall, legislation would also be needed to close it, and the Company of Apothecaries' Hall continues to exist as a charitable organisation, although it can no longer serve its primary function.

The Company of Apothecaries’ Hall continues to operate as one of only two direct extant successors of a medieval Dublin guild; the other is the Company of Goldsmiths (successor to the medieval Guild of All Saints) which still runs the Dublin Assay Office.

Guildhalls and Premises
The Guild of St Luke met at the Three Stags’ Heads Tavern on Eustace Street, Dublin.

In 1791, Apothecaries' Hall was erected at 40 Mary Street, at a cost of £6,000.  The hall contained a spacious chemical laboratory where medicines were prepared. Lectures were delivered at the hall, and part of it was also a wholesale warehouse, where the apothecaries could procure their materials.

In 1837, the medical school of the Apothecaries’ Hall was established in Cecilia Street, Dublin, which received the necessary recognition from the Royal College of Surgeons in Ireland. In 1854, the buildings and contents were purchased for £1,500 in the name of Andrew Ellis FRCSI, Professor of Surgery in the School of Apothecaries' Hall at Cecilia Street, and a Catholic, to form the Catholic University Medical School which opened in 1855.

In 1923, Apothecaries’ Hall moved to 95 Merrion Square, which was sold in 2011. The Company of Apothecaries’ Hall is now hosted by the Royal College of Physicians of Ireland whose premises on Kildare Street it shares.

See also
 Guilds of the City of Dublin

External links 

1791 establishments in Ireland
Medical associations based in Ireland
Pharmacy-related professional associations
Organizations established in 1791
Guilds in Ireland